Rodney Francis Ellingworth (born 11 August 1972) is a British former professional cyclist, who currently works as the racing director of UCI WorldTeam . Previously, he worked as a coach for the  professional cycling team, and from January 2013 their performance manager, responsible for overseeing the sports directors and race coaches.

Career
Born in Burnley, Lancashire, Ellingworth competed as a professional cyclist between 1995 and 1997 and represented his country several times at international events.

He was the coach for British Cycling's U23 Academy '100% ME' team based in Tuscany, Italy. At the end of 2008 he was promoted to the role of senior endurance coach, with the aim to creating a team and a rider strong enough to win the men's world road race championships.

Mark Cavendish is one of the riders who has been influenced by Ellingworth with Cavendish stating in several interviews that he had learnt a lot from Ellingworth, and not only about cycling. Ellingworth has also led the National team to several stage victories in the Tour of Britain in 2007.

Major results

1995
 2nd Tom Simpson Memorial Race
 9th Girvan 3 day 'Premier Calendar' race
1st Stage 2
1996
 1st Points classification Girvan 3 day 'Premier Calendar'
2000
 1st Overall Tour of the Kingdom
1st Stage 1
 2nd Overall East Riding of Yorkshire Classic (2 day) 'Premier Calendar' race
 3rd Overall Girvan 3 day 'Premier Calendar' race

References

Bibliography

External links
 
 
 Rod Ellingworth at Team Sky

1972 births
Living people
English cycling coaches
English male cyclists
People from Grantham